Hebronville Mill Historic District is a historic district in Attleboro, Massachusetts.  The mill complex includes manufacturing buildings, worker housing, and a railroad bridge over the mill's tail race.

The Hebronville Mill Warehouse and Processing Company was owned and operated by John J. Ryan and Sons Cotton Brokers from the late 1920s through the Second World War until the early 1950s. During this time, the mill was managed by Edward "Ted"  W. Corr of Taunton, Massachusetts.  The main function of the mill was reprocessing of cotton waste material obtained from 20 other company mills located throughout Rhode Island and Massachusetts.

The district was added to the National Register of Historic Places in 1984.

See also
National Register of Historic Places listings in Bristol County, Massachusetts

References

Historic districts in Bristol County, Massachusetts
Attleboro, Massachusetts
National Register of Historic Places in Bristol County, Massachusetts
Historic districts on the National Register of Historic Places in Massachusetts